Prasanta Chatterjee, a politician from Communist Party of India (Marxist), is a Member of the Parliament of India representing West Bengal in the Rajya Sabha, the upper house of the Parliament.

External links
 Profile on Rajya Sabha website

Communist Party of India (Marxist) politicians from West Bengal
Living people
City College, Kolkata alumni
University of Calcutta alumni
1939 births
Rajya Sabha members from West Bengal